The European Union Special Representatives (EUSR) are emissaries of the European Union with specific tasks abroad. While the EU's ambassadors are responsible for affairs with a single country, Special Representatives tackle specific issues, conflict areas or regions of countries. They answer directly to the High Representative of the Union for Foreign Affairs and Security Policy, currently Josep Borrell.

Current SRs by region

Europe

Bosnia and Herzegovina 

Peter Sørensen took over the position of EUSR in Bosnia and Herzegovina with a mandate from 1 September 2011 until 30 June 2015. His post was de-coupled from the one of High Representative for Bosnia and Herzegovina (which remained in the hands of Valentin Inzko), aiming at fostering the EU pre-accession strategy for Bosnia and Herzegovina. However, in November 2014, Sørensen became Head of the EU Delegation in Geneva, leaving the EUSR BiH post vacant. Lars-Gunnar Wigemark was appointed as the EUSR in Bosnia and Herzegovina from 1 March 2015 until 31 October 2015. His mandate was extended until 30 June 2018 and again until 31 August 2019. Johann Sattler replaced him in 2019, with a mandate from 1 September 2019 to 31 August 2023.

Kosovo 
Tomáš Szunyog was appointed as Special Representative in Kosovo on 30 July 2020. His mandate runs from 1 September 2020 until 31 August 2023.

South Caucasus and the Crisis in Georgia 

Toivo Klaar was appointed Special Representative for the South Caucasus and the crisis in Georgia on 13 November 2017. His mandate was extended until 29 February 2020, and again until 28 February 2021. His mandate was again extended until 28 February 2022, and then again until 31 August 2022, and then again until 31 August 2023.

Belgrade-Pristina Dialogue and other Western Balkan regional issues 
On 3 April 2020, Miroslav Lajčák was appointed by the EU Council as Special Representative for the Belgrade-Pristina Dialogue and other Western Balkan regional issues. His 12-month mandate includes the tasks to achieve comprehensive normalisation of the relations between Serbia and Kosovo, improve good neighbourly relations and reconciliation between partners in the Western Balkans, helping them overcome the legacy of the past, and contribute to the consistency and effectiveness of EU action in the Western Balkans. His mandate runs from 2 April 2020 until 31 August 2022. His mandate was renewed until 31 August 2024.

Asia

Central Asia 
Terhi Hakala is the Special Representative for Central Asia. Her mandate is to promote good relations between the EU and central Asian countries and to strengthen stability, cooperation, democracy and respect for human rights in the region. In particular, the EU Special Representative will co-ordinate EU action in central Asia and oversee the implementation of the EU Strategy for central Asia. Her mandate runs from 1 July 2021 to 28 February 2023. Her mandate was extended to 28 February 2025.

Middle East 
Sven Koopmans has been appointed Special Representative for the Middle East peace process. His mandate runs from 1 May 2021 until 28 February 2023. Between 2017 and 2021 "he was a Member of Parliament in the Netherlands, where he was spokesperson on foreign affairs and head of delegation in the NATO Parliamentary Assembly." The mandate of the Special Representative is based on the EU's policy objectives regarding the Middle East peace process, which include a two-State solution with Israel and a democratic, contiguous, viable, peaceful and sovereign Palestinian State living side by side within secure and recognised borders enjoying normal relations with their neighbours in accordance with UN Security Council Resolutions 242, 338, 1397 and 1402 and the principles of the Madrid Conference. His mandate was extended until 28 February 2025.

Africa

Horn of Africa (incl. the region of Sudan)
Annette Weber was appointed Special Representative for the Horn of Africa on 1 July 2021. Her mandate runs until 31 August 2022. Her mandate was extended until 31 August 2024.

Sahel
Emanuela Del Re was appointed as the Special Representative for the Sahel on 21 June 2021. Her mandate runs from 1 July 2021 until 31 August 2022. Her mandate was renewed until 31 August 2024.

Global

Human Rights
A long-standing request for a representative that would be in charge of enhancing the effectiveness and visibility of EU's human rights policy, based on the Strategic Framework and Action Plan on Human Rights and Democracy (officially adopted on 25 June 2012), led to the creation of the post of the Special Representative of the European Union for Human Rights. The post, which is providing a strong, independent, flexible and sufficiently broad mandate, is aiming to cover fields such as the strengthening of democracy, International justice, humanitarian law and the abolition of the death penalty .

On 19 February 2019, the High Representative of the European Union for Foreign Affairs and Security Policy Federica Mogherini nominated Eamon Gilmore to be European Union Special Representative for Human Rights. His nomination was approved by the Foreign Affairs Council on 20 February 2019. His mandate runs from 1 March 2019 until 28 February 2023. His mandate was extended until 29 February 2024.

Previous SRs 
The table below is based on official sources provided by the EU.

References

External links 
 Official list of EU Special Representatives 
 Official list of current EU Special Representatives
 Official list of former EU Special Representatives
 Exploring EU Foreign Policy, the EUSR, Leuven Catholic University
 Giovanni Grevi, The EU Special Representatives, Chaillot Paper nb. 106, Institute for Security Studies of the European Union, Paris, 2007
 Cornelius Adebahr, Working inside out: what role for Special Envoys in the European External Action Service?, EPC Policy Brief, January 2011
 Dominik Tolksdorf, The Role of EU Special Representatives in the post-Lisbon foreign policy system: A renaissance?, IES Policy Brief, Brussels, June 2012

Ambassadors of the European Union
Special Representatives
Special Representative